Robbie Haemhouts (born 9 December 1983 in Brasschaat) is a Belgian professional former footballer who spent his entire career in The Netherlands, playing as a midfielder.

Honours

Club
Willem II
Eerste Divisie (1): 2013–14

External links
 

1983 births
Living people
Belgian footballers
Willem II (football club) players
NAC Breda players
FC Emmen players
Almere City FC players
Helmond Sport players
FC Den Bosch players
Eredivisie players
Eerste Divisie players
People from Brasschaat
Association football midfielders
Footballers from Antwerp Province